Air France Flight 2005 of 12 September 1961 was a scheduled international passenger flight from Paris-Orly Airport to Casablanca Airport with a stop at Rabat-Salé Airport. The weather was foggy and unfavourable for landing.

Flight history

The aircraft left Paris (ORY) at 18:26 GMT for the first leg to Rabat with passengers and load within limits and fuel for four hours. The flight was uneventful until approaching Rabat/Salè airport. At 21:09 GMT the aircraft hit the ground before reaching the runway. It was completely destroyed.

Investigation

The investigation concluded that there was no evidence of technical failure, neither for physical failure of the personnel nor of air traffic control. Weather conditions were very unfavourable for landing at Rabat/Salé and fast changing and deteriorating shortly before the accident. The pilot took advice from the Air France operations agent in Casablanca and considered proceeding directly to Casablanca because of the weather.

During the flight the crew reviewed the weather several times with the air traffic control and finally decided to land at Rabat, using the non-directional beacon (NDB). Air traffic control warned the pilot that the NDB was not aligned with the runway, but this message received no response.
The investigation reported an "Error in instrument reading" as probable cause.

See also
 Air France Flight 406, another Air France aviation disaster that took place on the continent of Africa in 1961

References
"Air France, SE 210 III Caravelle F-BJTB, accident near Rabat-Salé Airport, Morocco, 12 September 1961" (Archive). The Minister of Foreign Affairs, Morocco. – Prepared by Harro Ranter. Source: Aircraft Accident Digest No.16 (ICAO Circular 69-AN/61 ) page 169–175.
Aviation Safety Network article

Accidents and incidents involving the Sud Aviation Caravelle
2005
Aviation accidents and incidents in 1961
Aviation accidents and incidents in Morocco
Airliner accidents and incidents caused by instrument failure
September 1961 events in Africa
1961 in Morocco
1961 disasters in Morocco